Bay d'Espoir  is an arm of Hermitage Bay in the Gulf of Saint Lawrence, located on the south coast of Newfoundland. Communities in Bay d'Espoir include: Milltown-Head of Bay d'Espoir, Morrisville, St. Alban's, St. Joseph's Cove, St. Veronica's and Miawpukek. The Miawpukek First Nation reserve of Samiajij Miawpukek (Conne River) is located in Bay d'Espoir.

Name
The name appears in printed form with many different spellings, some of which are: Bay D' Espoir/e, Bay of Despair, Bay Despoir/e, Baie D' Espoir/e, Baie Despair and Baie Despoir/e.

Bay d'Espoir is often translated locally either as Bay of Hope or Bay of Despair. The name Bay of Despair may be an English corruption of the French name Baie d'Espoir. However, the French cartographer Bellin referred to the bay as "Baie du Desespoir" on his 1743 map "Carte de l'Isle de Terre-Neuve". Therefore, the actual sequence may have been from "Baie du Desespoir" to the English literal translation "Bay of Despair", which appears as early as 1733 on a Henry Popple map, and then to a French corruption of this, namely "Baie d'Espoir". The English name "Bay of Despair" can also be found in a navigation guide written by James Cook.

In popular culture
Bay d'Espoir is the feature location of Farley Mowat's 2006 autobiography "Bay of Spirits", in which Mowat chronicles his time living on the southwest coast of the island of Newfoundland.

See also
 Bay d'Espoir Academy
 Bay d'Espoir Hydroelectric Power Station
List of communities in Newfoundland and Labrador

References 

Espoir